The 1967 Utah State Aggies football team was an American football team that represented Utah State University as an independent during the 1967 NCAA University Division football season. In their first season under head coach Chuck Mills, the Aggies compiled a 7–2–1 record and outscored their opponents 205 to 143. This was the Aggies' final season at the original Romney Stadium; they moved to a larger venue of the same name in 1968, located several blocks north.

The team's statistical leaders included John Pappas with 1,424 passing yards, Altie Taylor with 717 rushing yards, Mike O'Shea with 599 receiving yards, Jim Murphy with 43 points scored (eight field goals and 19 extra points), and Bill Staley with 132 total tackles.

Hired in February, Mills was previously the offensive coordinator with the Kansas City Chiefs, the champions of the American Football League (AFL). Tony Knap had resigned in January for an assistant coaching position with the BC Lions in the Canadian Football League (CFL).

Schedule

NFL/AFL Draft
Fullback MacArthur Lane was the thirteenth overall selection of the 1968 NFL/AFL draft, taken by the St. Louis Cardinals, and played eleven seasons in the National Football League (NFL).

References

Utah State
Utah State Aggies football seasons
Utah State Aggies football